The Gilliam Indoor Track Stadium is the home of the Texas A&M Aggies men's and women's collegiate indoor track and field teams. Opened on January 24, 2009, the facility hosted the 2009 Big 12 Conference indoor track championships as well as the 2009 NCAA Division I indoor track national championships.

References

External links
AggieAthletics.com info page

College indoor track and field venues in the United States
Indoor track and field venues in the United States
Sports venues in College Station, Texas
Texas A&M Aggies track and field
Texas A&M Aggies sports venues
Athletics (track and field) venues in Texas